Fazle Rabby (born 1 December 1997) is a Bangladeshi cricketer. He made his List A debut for Agrani Bank Cricket Club in the 2017–18 Dhaka Premier Division Cricket League on 6 March 2018.

References

External links
 

1997 births
Living people
Bangladeshi cricketers
Agrani Bank Cricket Club cricketers
Place of birth missing (living people)